LP 71-82 is a red dwarf star, located in constellation Draco at 25.42 light-years from Earth. Kinematically, it is probably belongs to the Ursa Major Moving Group.

Multiplicity surveys do not found any stellar companions to LP 71-82 as in 2014.

Physical properties
LP 71-82 is a flare star with a very strong activity, with at least four flares detected by 2019. Such activity is expected for a star with a short rotational period of just 6 hours. As a low mass star, it is fully convective. It is visible nearly pole-on, with rotational axis deflected from the Sun by 19° degrees. The star has a magnetic fields in chromosphere in 3.8-4.7 kilogauss range.

References

Draco (constellation)
M-type main-sequence stars
J18021660+6415445
Flare stars